Jherek Bischoff (born September 11, 1979) is an American composer, arranger, producer, and multi-instrumental performer based in Los Angeles. His credits include over seventy albums and compositions for orchestra, opera, film, theater, and ballet. Utilizing orchestral, electronic and rock instrumentation, Bischoff blends contemporary classical, ambient and experimental rock music.

Bischoff has released over a dozen studio albums as a solo artist and band member and has credits as a musician, arranger, producer or engineer on over sixty albums. He has written several orchestral commissions for the likes of Kronos Quartet and the Pacific Northwest Ballet, and renowned orchestras, including the BBC Symphony Orchestra and the National Symphony Orchestra, have performed his work. Bischoff has written scores for five plays, including the Royal National Theatre's production of Neil Gaiman's The Ocean at the End of the Lane and an opera, Andersen's Erzahlungen, for Theatre Basel. Bischoff has also written or performed on scores for television and film, including Wet Hot American Summer: First Day of Camp, A Futile and Stupid Gesture, Glow, and New Amsterdam.

Biography

Background 
Bischoff was born in Sacramento, California. When he was a young child his parents decided they wanted to move aboard a sailboat, and eventually sailed up the coast to the Pacific Northwest. Bischoff spent his early years on the boat and when he was 14 years old, the family departed on a two-year sailing trip to Central America, through the Panama Canal and into the Caribbean.

The family eventually returned to their home on Bainbridge Island, Washington, where Bischoff learned to play a wide variety of instruments. Bischoff has some fluency on a number of woodwinds (saxophone, clarinet), brass (tuba, trombone, trumpet) and stringed instruments (electric bass, guitar, ukulele, banjo, stand-up bass, cello, violin). As a composer, Bischoff is largely self-taught having attended part-time college classes on the topic and gaining experience by writing arrangements and compositions for fellow artists in the Seattle music scene. Music was also a family tradition. His father, who had studied music at the University of California, Davis with John Cage and Stanley Lunetta, had been in avant garde and experimental bands throughout the 1970s.

Career 
Bischoff first emerged as a musician in the first decade of the 2000s. He was a member and collaborator with Parenthetical Girls, Xiu Xiu, Degenerate Art Ensemble, and The Dead Science.

Bischoff gained attention as a solo artist upon the 2012 release of Composed and a related instrumental album Scores: Composed Instrumentals. The album features nine orchestral pieces with a different vocalist on eight of the nine tracks. Many of the vocalists are well known, and included David Byrne, Caetano Veloso, Mirah, Carla Bozulich (Evangelista, Geraldine Fibbers), Craig Wedren (Shudder to Think), Dawn McCarthy (Faun Fables), Zac Pennington (Parenthetical Girls), Soko and more. Guest soloists included Greg Saunier (Deerhoof) and Nels Cline (Wilco). The album was first composed by Bischoff on a ukulele. He then orchestrated, engineered, and mastered the album, achieving an orchestral sound at a low cost by recording the instrumentalists one at a time using a single microphone and a laptop computer recording set-up. Pitchfork wrote that listening to the album whilst being aware of the process "is like imagining someone filling an Olympic-sized pool with an eye dropper: the mind balks, both at the enormity of the undertaking and at the disposition of the person behind it".  Bischoff was interviewed by Terry Gross for her NPR show Fresh Air, where he spoke largely about his unique childhood growing up on a sailboat, and the unconventional process by which he recorded his album Composed.

In 2016, Bischoff released Cistern, an ambient orchestral album inspired by time he spent in an empty two million gallon underground water tank under Fort Worden in Port Townsend, Washington. The size of the space was a huge factor in the development of the album. In an interview Bischoff described how "the vast emptiness of the cistern generates a reverb decay that lasts 45 seconds. That means, if you snap your fingers, the sound lasts 45 seconds. That amount of reverberation is an absolutely wild environment to try to create music in". This led to "a record intrinsically linked to the space in which it was conceived. A space which forced Bischoff to slow down, to reflect, to draw on his childhood growing up on a sailing boat – an unexpected journey of rediscovery, from the city back to the Pacific Ocean". Bischoff recorded the album with the New York-based Contemporaneous ensemble at Future-Past in Hudson, NY, a recording studio housed in an historic 19th-century church. Upon release of the album, Bischoff was the featured artist for Times Square Arts Midnight Moment for the month of August and the video for "Cistern" played on screens throughout Times Square. On August 21 and 22, Bischoff performed the album in the middle of Times Square accompanied by his Silent Orchestra on electronic instruments with the audio streamed to wireless headphones.

Bischoff's work for theater includes his 2015 debut Johnny Breitwieser, a musical for Theater Basel; The Flying Classroom, a children's musical for Theater Basel (2016); The Sandman, a Robert Wilson production and collaboration with Anna Calvi, for Düsseldorf's Schauspielhaus (2017); Andersen's Stories, his first opera for Theater Basel (2019); The Ocean at the End of the Lane, the Royal National Theatre's stage adaptation of the book of the same name by Neil Gaiman (2019), which received a West End transfer to the Duke of York's Theatre in 2022 and is currently touring the UK and Ireland through 2023; and Eureka Day, a production for The Old Vic in partnership with Sonia Friedman Productions (2022).

Critical reception 
Bischoff has been called a "pop polymath" (The New York Times), a "phenom" (The New Yorker), an "orchestral-pop mastermind" (Spin), and "the missing link between the sombre undertones of Ennio Morricone and the unpredictability of John Cale" (New Musical Express). He "is known for pushing the limits of orchestral music" (NPR).

Bischoff was a finalist for The Stranger's Music Genius Award in 2013 and was named Seattle's Best Collaborator by the Seattle Weekly in 2014.

Bischoff was nominated for The Stage Debut Awards 2020 in the Best Composer or Lyricist category for his score for The Ocean at the End of the Lane.

Works

Albums as Jherek Bischoff

 Jherek Bischoff (2006)
Composed (2012)
Scores: Composed Instrumentals (2012)
Cistern (2016)
Improvisations (2020)
The Ocean at the End of the Lane - Music from the National Theatre Production (2021)

EPs as Jherek Bischoff 

Under the Sour Trees – Split with Richard Webb (2009)
Chestnuts Roasting on an Open Fire Walk with Me – an EP of Holiday covers in the style of Angelo Badalementi's score for Twin Peaks (2017)
Chestnuts Roasting on an Open Fire Walk with Me - Deluxe Version / Remastered (2020)

Singles as Jherek Bischoff 

Jherek Bischoff vs Konono N°1 – Kule Kule (Orchestral Version) – Song on Compilation Tradi-Mods vs Rockers (2010)
"Red Cloak" (2017)
"Reminder" (2017)
"Super Blue Blood Moon" (2017)
"Gobo" (2018)
"Celebration" – Devendra Banhart cover (2018)

Albums as Ribbons

Royals (2008)

Commissions 

 "A Semi-perfect Number" (2013) - Commissioned for Kronos Quartet by Lincoln Center for Lincoln Center Out of Doors
 "Puffinsmilk" (2014) - Commissioned for Red Hot + Bach by Red Hot
 "The Ballad of Guiteau" (2015) - Commissioned for Liaisons: Re-Imagining Sondheim From the Piano by the Liaisons Project
 "Flying Rivers" (2017) - Commissioned for Kronos Quartet by San Francisco Performances
 "Childhood's Retreat" (2017) - Commissioned for Black Mountain Songs by Brooklyn Youth Chorus
 "Stranger" (2018) - Commissioned for Kronos Quartet by 21C Music Festival at The Royal Conservatory of Music
 Jump!Star (2019) - Symphony commissioned for Kansas City Symphony by the Symphony in the Flint Hills
 Wash of Gray (Locally Sourced) (2019) - Ballet commissioned for Pacific Northwest Ballet
 So Fragile, So Blue (2022) - Song Suite co-written with William Shatner and Robert Sharenow and commissioned by The Kennedy Center

Theater & Dance 

 Johnny Breitwieser (2015) - Musical premiered by Schauspielhaus Vienna, Austria
 Souvenir (Theatre Royal) (2016) - Performance w/ Meow Meow, premiered at Theatre Royal, Hobart, Australia
 Das Fliegende Klassenzimmer (2016) - Musical premiered by Theater Basel, Switzerland
 Robert Wilson's The Sandman (2017) - Musical premiered by Düsseldorfer Schauspielhaus, Germany
 Rita Riot / Rita Dreaming / Rita Requiem (2017) - Performance piece w/ Meow Meow, premiered at Sgt. Pepper at 50, Liverpool, UK
 Souvenir (Theatre Royal) (2016) - Performance w/ Meow Meow, premiered at Theatre Royal, Hobart, Australia
 Andersens Erzählungen (2019) - Opera premiered by Theater Basel, Switzerland
 The Ocean at the End of the Lane (2019) - Play premiered by National Theatre, London, UK
 The Journey (2020-1) - Virtual Performance by Scott Silven premiered by The Momentary, Bentonville, AR
 Eureka Day (2022) - Play premiered by The Old Vic, London, UK

Film & Television 

 Beautiful Ohio (2006) - Film by Chad Lowe
 My Pain is Worse than Your Pain (2012) - Short Film by Adam Hall
 Wet Hot American Summer: First Day of Camp (2015) - Film by David Wain and Michael Showalter
 Blunt Talk (2015–16) - TV Series by Jonathan Ames and Seth MacFarlane
 Thank You for Coming (2017) - Film by Sara Lamm
 A Fultile and Stupid Gesture (2018) - Film by David Wain
 Dog Days (2018) - Film by Ken Marino
 New Amsterdam (2018–21) - TV Series by David Schulner
 The Grave of St Oran (2019) - Short film by Jim Batt
 Glow (2019) - TV Series by Liz Fahive and Carly Mensch
 The Mushroom Hunters (2019) - Short Film by Caroline Rudge
 The Beauty of Decay (2021) - Short Film by David Rowe
 Achieving Perspective (2022) - Short film w/ David Byrne for The Universe in Verse, directed by SALT Project
 Organ Trail (2023) - Film by Michael Patrick Jann

Live Performance Orchestration & Arrangements 
 Recess Monkey & The Seattle Symphony (2014) - Benaroya Hall
 Meow Meow & The San Francisco Symphony (2015) - SoundBox
 Neil Gaiman (2015) – The Sleeper and The Spindle Live w/ String Quartet
 Ariel Pink & Technical University of Cologne Choir (2015) - Week-end Festival
 Anna Calvi & Heritage Orchestra (2017) - Burberry 2017 Collection
 bachSpace & Deutsches Kammerochester Berlin (2017) - DRIVE Berlin
 Devendra Banhart & Rundfunk-Tanzorchester Ehrenfield (2017) - Week-end Festival
 Jon Batiste & The National Symphony Orchestra (2018) - The Kennedy Center
 Regina Spektor & The National Symphony Orchestra (2018) - The Kennedy Center
 Sarah Silverman & The National Symphony Orchestra (2019) - The Kennedy Center
 Angel Olsen (2019) - The Tonight Show
 Neil Gaiman, Amanda Palmer & The BBC Symphony Orchestra (2019) - Barbican Centre
 Emily King, Jamey Johnson & The National Symphony Orchestra (2019) - The Kennedy Center
 Ben Folds & The National Symphony Orchestra (2020) - The Kennedy Center
 The Orchestra Rocks NYC for Link Up (2021) - Carnegie Hall
 Ben Folds Presents with William Shatner (2022) - The Kennedy Center
 Mickey Guyton & Nashville Symphony (2022) - Schermerhorn Symphony Center

w/ Amanda Palmer 

Theatre Is Evil (2012)
Strung Out in Heaven: A Bowie String Quartet Tribute (2016)
"Machete" (2016)
"Purple Rain" – Prince cover (2016)
"Everybody Knows" / "Democracy" – Leonard Cohen cover (2017)
"In Harms Way" (2017)
"Mother" – Pink Floyd cover (2017)
Quartet for Dolores: A Tribute to Dolores O'Riordan of the Cranberries (2018)
There will be No Intermission (2019)
Forty-Five Degrees - A Bushfire Charity Flash Record  (2020)
"It's a Fire" - Portishead cover (2021)
"Enjoy the Silence" - Depeche Mode cover (2021)
"Surface Pressure" - cover from Disney's Encanto (2022)

w/ Meow Meow 

 Johnny Breitwieser (2018)

w/ Xiu Xiu 

Chapel of the Chimes EP (2002)
A Promise (2003)
Fabulous Muscles (2004)
Xiu Xiu Plays the Music of Twin Peaks (2016)
Oh No (2021)

w/ Sondre Lerche 

 "Surviving Christmas" (2015)

w/ Parenthetical Girls

(((GRRRLS))) (2004)
Safe as Houses (2006)
Entanglements (2008)
The Scottish Play (2009)
Morrissey/The Smiths – 7" Split with Xiu Xiu (2009)
Privilege, Pt. I: On Death & Endearments (2010)
Privilege, Pt. II: The Past, Imperfect (2010)
Privilege, Pt. III: Mend & Make Do (2011)
Privilege, Pt. IV: Sympathy For Spastics (2011)
Privilege, Pt. V: Portrait of a Reputation (2012)
Privilege (Abridged) (2013)

w/ Degenerate Art Ensemble

Look-Away Popeye (2003)
The Bastress (2005)
Cuckoo Crow (2006)
Sonic Tales (2009)

w/ The Dead Science

Submariner (2003)
Bird Bones in the Bughouse EP (2004)
Frost Giant (2005)
Crepuscule with The Dead Science EP (2006)
Villainaire (2008)

w/ Casiotone for the Painfully Alone

Twinkle Echo (2003)
Graceland 7" (2006)
Young Shields EP (2006)
Etiquette (2006)

w/ Jason Webley 

Counterpoint (2002)
Only Just Beginning (2004)
The Cost of Living (2008)
In This Light: Live at Bear Creek (2011)

Other Recorded Collaborations

 Yellow Swans – Psychic Secession (2006)
The Octopus Project – Hello, Avalanche (2007)
Holy Ghost Revival – Bleeding Light (2007)
AU – Au (2007)
Filastine – Dirty Bomb (2009), Burn It, (2006)
Past Lives – The Journal of Popular Noise: Volume 1, Issue 7 (2009)
Sleuth – Brave Knew Nothing (2011)
Kultur Shock – Ministry of Kultur, (2011)
Sam Mickens – Slay & Slake (2011), Ecstatic Showband & Revue (2011)
Strawberry Hands – Ten Darkened Chambers/I Love You When 7" (2012)
Stay Calm – Fall In Love/Break Up (2012)
Soko – I Thought I Was an Alien (2012)
People Get Ready – People Get Ready (2012), People Get Ready EP (2011)
The Elwins – And I Thank You (2013)
 Kevin Presbrey – Dust Unto Dust (2013)
 Debora Petrina – Petrina (2013)
No Sky God – Homophonia (2013)
Cool Memories – Enter The Host (2013)
B’shnorkestra – Go To Orange (2013)
Led To Sea – Led To Sea (2008), Into the Darkening Sky (2010), Slowly We Decay (2013)
Missy Higgins – OZ (2014)
Maya Beiser – Uncovered (2014)
Yacht – See Mystery Lights (2009), Shangri-La (2011), I Thought the Future would be Cooler (2015)
Vance Joy – "Fire and the Flood (2015)
Recess Monkey – Desert Island Disc (2013), Deep Sea Diver (2013), Novelties (2016)
Lily Kershaw – "For Keeps" (2016)
Sara Jackson-Holman – Didn't Go to the Party (2016)
Craig Wedren – WAND (2011), Adult Desire (2017)
Comedienne – "Hideout" & "Providence Street" (2017)
Mirah – The Changing Lights (2014), Sundial (2017)
Robert Forster – "People Say" & "In Her Diary" (2017)
Madisen Ward & The Mama Bear – The Radio Winner (2018)
Object As Subject – Permission (2018)
Pumarosa – Devastation (2019)
Brian Eno – "Everything's on the Up with the Tories" (2019)
Local Natives - Sour Lemon EP (2020)
Popular Music - Popular Music Plays In Darkness (2020)
Eliza Rickman – Footnotes for the Spring (2015), "Riches and Wonders" – Mountain Goats Cover (2018), "Pretty Good Year" – Tori Amos Cover (2021)
Briston Maroney - Miracle (2020), Sunflower (2021)
Campesinos! – Romance is Boring (2010), Hello Sadness (2011), Sick Scenes (2017), Whole Damn Body (2021)
Angel Olsen – All Mirrors (2019), Song of the Lark and Other Far Memories (2021)
SHAED - High Dive (2021)
Regina Spektor - Home, Before and After (2022)
David Byrne - "Fat Man's Comin'" (2022)

References

External links
Official website
Jherek Bischoff on Bandcamp
Jherek Bischoff on The Leaf Label

1979 births
Musicians from Seattle
Living people
Musicians from Sacramento, California
Musicians from Bainbridge Island, Washington
21st-century American composers